The Trenton Psychiatric Hospital is a state run mental hospital located in Trenton and Ewing, New Jersey.  It previously operated under the name New Jersey State Hospital at Trenton and originally as the New Jersey State Lunatic Asylum.

Founded by Dorothea Lynde Dix on May 15, 1848, it was the first public mental hospital in the state of New Jersey, and the first mental hospital designed on the principle of the Kirkbride Plan.  The architect was the Scottish-American John Notman.

Under the hospital's first superintendent, Dr. Horace A. Buttolph, the hospital admitted and treated 86 patients.  In 1907, Dr. Henry Cotton became the medical director.  Believing that infections were the key to mental illness, he had his staff remove teeth and various other body parts that might become infected from the hospital patients.  Cotton's legacy of hundreds of fatalities and thousands of maimed and mutilated patients did not end with his leaving Trenton in 1930 or his death in 1933; in fact, removal of patients' teeth at the Trenton asylum was still the norm until 1960.

See also
John Forbes Nash (1928–2015), patient
Nathan Trupp (born 1947), patient
Howard Unruh (1921–2009), patient
Human experimentation in the United States
Willowbrook State School
Greystone Park Psychiatric Hospital, the second "lunatic asylum" opened in New Jersey (1876).
Madhouse: A Tragic Tale of Megalomania and Modern Medicine

References

External links
Trenton Psychiatric Hospital, New Jersey Department of Human Services, Division of Mental Health Services
http://www.rootsweb.com/~asylums/trenton_nj/
http://ajp.psychiatryonline.org/cgi/content/full/156/12/1982
http://www.forgottenphotography.com

Psychiatric hospitals in New Jersey
Hospitals established in 1848
Buildings and structures in Mercer County, New Jersey
Kirkbride Plan hospitals
Psychiatry controversies
Buildings and structures in Trenton, New Jersey